The 63rd Indian Infantry Brigade was an infantry brigade formation of the Indian Army during World War II. It was formed in January 1942, at Jhansi in India and was assigned to the 23rd Indian Infantry Division and served in the Burma Campaign. In March 1942, it was reassigned to the 17th Indian Infantry Division with whom it remained for the rest of the war apart from in May 1942, when it was attached to the 39th Indian Infantry Division.

Formation
1st Battalion, 11th Sikh Regiment January to August 1942
1st Battalion, 10th Gurkha Rifles January to August 1945
2nd Battalion, 13th Frontier Force Rifles February to July 1942
5th Battalion, 17th Dogra Regiment March to June 1942
1st Battalion, Gloucestershire Regiment June 1942 to June 1943
1st Battalion, 3rd Gurkha Rifles June 1942 to August 1944 
7th Battalion, 10th Baluch Regiment January to August 1943 and August 1944 to August 1945
1st Battalion, 4th Gurkha Rifles September 1943 to April 1944 and July to August 1944
1st Battalion, 16th Punjab Regiment October to December 1943
4th Battalion, 12th Frontier Force Regiment March 1944
9th Battalion, Border Regiment August 1944 to August 1945

See also

 List of Indian Army Brigades in World War II

References

British Indian Army brigades
Military units and formations in Burma in World War II